Under Heavy Manners is a reggae album by Prince Far I, released in 1976. The musicians were Joe Gibbs' house band, The Professionals.

Heavy Manners refers to the state of emergency declared in Jamaica in 1976.

Track listing
All tracks composed by Joe Gibbs; except where indicated
"Rain a Fall"
"Big Fight"
"You I Love and Not Another"
"Young Generation"
"Shine Eye Gal" (Errol Thompson)
"Boz Rock"
"Show Me Mine Enemy"
"Shadow"
"Deck of Cards"
"Heavy Manners"

Prince Far I albums
1976 albums